Polygrammodes limitalis is a moth in the family Crambidae. It is found on Borneo.

The wingspan is about 30 mm. Adults are similar to Polygrammodes purpuralis, but the basal red area of both wings is small and the discal expansion of the costal red fascia on the forewings are small.

References

Moths described in 1899
Spilomelinae
Moths of Asia